The enzyme poly(3-hydroxyoctanoate) depolymerase (EC 3.1.1.76) catalyzes the hydrolysis of the polyester poly{oxycarbonyl[(R)-2-pentylethylene] to oligomers

This enzyme belongs to the family of hydrolases, specifically those acting on carboxylic ester bonds.  The systematic name is poly{oxycarbonyl[(R)-2-pentylethylene]} hydrolase. Other names in common use include PHO depolymerase, poly(3HO) depolymerase, poly[(R)-hydroxyalkanoic acid] depolymerase, poly(HA) depolymerase, poly(HAMCL) depolymerase, and poly[(R)-3-hydroxyoctanoate] hydrolase.

References

 
 
 

EC 3.1.1
Enzymes of unknown structure